Stefaan Maria Joris Yolanda De Clerck (born 12 December 1951) is a Belgian politician and former Minister of Justice of Belgium. He was Minister of Justice from 1995 until 1998 as well, when he resigned following the escape from prison of Marc Dutroux. He has served as chairman of Christian Democratic and Flemish party and held a seat in the Belgian Chamber of Representatives. De Clerck was mayor of Kortrijk.

Regarding re-instituting the death penalty in Belgium after the "Joker" murders of 2009, GlobalPost quotes De Clerck as saying: "That is not something for our times. It's not by killing somebody that we solve society's problems, just look at the United States."

External links 

 

1951 births
Christian Democratic and Flemish politicians
Living people
Mayors of Kortrijk
Members of the Belgian Federal Parliament
KU Leuven alumni
Belgian Roman Catholics
21st-century Belgian politicians